{{Infobox criminal
| name              = Rudolf Höss
| birth_name        = Rudolf Franz Ferdinand Höß
| birth_date        = 
| death_date        = 
| birth_place       = Baden-Baden, Grand Duchy of Baden, German Empire
| death_place       = Oświęcim (Auschwitz), Polish People's Republic
| image             = Rudolf Höß crop.jpg
| caption           = Höss at trial before the Polish Supreme National Tribunal, 1947
| trial             = Supreme National Tribunal
| party             = Nazi Party #3240 (joined 1922)SS #193616  (joined 1934)
| conviction_penalty = Capital punishment
| spouse            =  
| children          = 5
| module            = {{Infobox military person |embed=yes|embed_title=SS service
|branch=Death's Head UnitsWaffen-SS
|serviceyears=1934–1945
|rank=SS-lieutenant colonel (Obersturmbannführer) (1942)
|unit=
|commands=* Block Leader and Report Leader in Dachau (November 1934)
 adjutant to the comandant (August 1938) and commander of the detention camp (December 1939) in Sachsenhausen
 Commandant in Auschwitz (30 April 1940)
 Head of office D I in the department D (Camps inspectorate) of SS-WVHA (1 December 1943)
 Chief Commandant (Standortältester) in Auschwitz ("Operation Höss" – mass murder of Hungarian jews)(8 May – 29 July 1944)
 Coordinator of killing operation by gassing in Ravensbrück (November 1944)
}}
| criminal_status   = Executed
| conviction        = Crimes against humanity
| death_cause       = Execution by hanging
}}Rudolf Franz Ferdinand Höss  (also Höß, Hoeß, or Hoess; 25 November 1901 – 16 April 1947) was a German SS officer during the Nazi era who, after the defeat of Nazi Germany, was convicted for war crimes. Höss was the longest-serving commandant of Auschwitz concentration and extermination camp (from 4 May 1940 to November 1943, and again from 8 May 1944 to 18 January 1945). He tested and implemented means to accelerate Hitler's order to systematically exterminate the Jewish population of Nazi-occupied Europe, known as the Final Solution. On the initiative of one of his subordinates, Karl Fritzsch, Höss introduced the pesticide Zyklon B to be used in gas chambers, where more than a million people were killed.

Höss was hanged in 1947 following a trial before the Polish Supreme National Tribunal. During his imprisonment, at the request of the Polish authorities, he wrote his memoirs, released in English under the title Commandant of Auschwitz: The Autobiography of Rudolf Hoess.

Upbringing
Höss was born in Baden-Baden into a strict Catholic family. He lived with his mother Lina (née Speck) and father Franz Xaver Höss. Höss was the eldest of three children and the only son. He was baptized Rudolf Franz Ferdinand on 11 December 1901. He was a lonely child with no companions of his own age until he entered elementary school; all of his associations were with adults. He claimed in his autobiography that he was briefly abducted by Romanis in his youth. His father, a former army officer who served in German East Africa, ran a tea and coffee business. He brought his son up on strict religious principles and with military discipline, having decided that he would enter the priesthood. Höss grew up with an almost fanatical belief in the central role of duty in a moral life. During his early years, there was a constant emphasis on sin, guilt, and the need to do penance.

Youth and World War I
When World War I broke out, Höss served briefly in a military hospital and then, at age 14, was admitted to his father's and grandfather's old regiment, the German Army's 21st Regiment of Dragoons. Aged 15, he fought with the Ottoman Sixth Army at Baghdad, at Kut-el-Amara, and in Palestine. Höss was present at the right time and place to have been a witness to the Armenian genocide, an event which is not mentioned in his memoirs. Wounded three times and a victim of malaria, he was awarded the Iron Crescent, the Iron Cross first and second class and other decorations. Höss also briefly commanded a cavalry unit. When the news of the armistice reached Damascus, where he was at that time, he and a few others decided not to wait for Allied forces to capture them as prisoners of war, but instead to try to ride all the way back home. This involved traversing the enemy territory of Romania, but they eventually made it back home to Bavaria.

Joining the Nazi party

After the Armistice of 11 November 1918, Höss completed his secondary education and soon joined some of the emerging nationalist paramilitary groups, first the East Prussian Volunteer Corps, and then the Free Corps "Rossbach" in the Baltic area, Silesia and the Ruhr. Höss participated in the armed terror attacks on Polish people during the Silesian uprisings against the Germans, and on French nationals during the French Occupation of the Ruhr. After hearing a speech by Adolf Hitler in Munich, he joined the Nazi Party in 1922 (member number 3240) and renounced affiliation with the Catholic Church.

On 31 May 1923, in Mecklenburg, Höss and members of the Free Korps attacked and beat to death local schoolteacher Walther Kadow on the wishes of farm supervisor Martin Bormann, who later became Hitler's private secretary. Kadow was believed to have tipped off the French occupational authorities that Free Corps  paramilitary soldier Albert Leo Schlageter was carrying out sabotage operations against French supply lines. Schlageter was arrested and executed on 26 May 1923; soon afterwards Höss and several accomplices, including Bormann, took their revenge on Kadow. In 1923, after one of the killers confessed to a local newspaper, Höss was arrested and tried as the ringleader. Although he later claimed that another man was actually in charge, Höss accepted the blame as the group's leader. He was convicted and sentenced (on 15  or 17 March 1924) to ten years in Brandenburg penitentiary, while Bormann received a one-year sentence.

Höss was released in July 1928 as part of a general amnesty and joined the Artaman League, an anti-urbanization movement, or back-to-the-land movement, that promoted a farm-based lifestyle. On 17 August 1929, he married Hedwig Hensel (3 March 1908 – 1989), whom he met in the Artaman League.  Between 1930 and 1943 they had five children: two sons (Klaus and Hans-Rudolf) and three daughters (Heidetraut, Ingebrigitt, and Annegret). Heidetraut, Höss's eldest daughter, was born in 1932; Ingebrigitt was born on a farm in northern Germany in 1934; and Annegret, the youngest, was born in Auschwitz in November 1943."Hitler's Children", BBC documentary It was during this time that he became acquainted with Heinrich Himmler.

SS career
On 1 April 1934 Höss joined the SS, on Himmler's effective call-to-action, and in the same year moved to the Death's Head Units. He came to admire Himmler so much that he considered whatever he said to be the "gospel" and preferred to display his picture in his office rather than that of Hitler. Höss was assigned to the Dachau concentration camp in December 1934, where he held the post of Block leader. His mentor at Dachau was the then SS-brigadier general Theodor Eicke, the reorganizer of Nazi concentration camp system. In 1938, Höss was promoted to SS-captain and was made adjutant to Hermann Baranowski in the Sachsenhausen concentration camp. There he led the firing squad that, on Himmler's orders on 15 September 1939, killed August Dickman, a Jehovah's Witness who was the first conscientious objector to be executed after the start of the War. Höss fired the finishing shot from his pistol. He joined the Waffen-SS in 1939 after the invasion of Poland. Höss excelled in that capacity, and was recommended by his superiors for further responsibility and promotion. By the end of his tour of duty there, he was serving as administrator of prisoners' property. On January 18, 1940, as head of the protective custody camp at Sachsenhausen, Höss ordered all prisoners not assigned to work details to stand outside in frigid conditions reaching -26 Celsius.  Most of the inmates had no coats or gloves.  When block elders dragged some of the frozen inmates to the infirmary, Höss ordered the infirmary doors to be closed.  During the day, 78 inmates died; another 67 died that night.

Auschwitz command

Höss was dispatched to evaluate the feasibility of establishing a concentration camp in western Poland, a territory Germany had incorporated into the province of Upper Silesia. His favorable report led to the creation of Auschwitz and his appointment as its commandant.  The camp was built around an old Austro-Hungarian (and later Polish) army barracks near the town of Oświęcim; its German name was Auschwitz. Höss commanded the camp for three and a half years, during which he expanded the original facility into a sprawling complex known as Auschwitz-Birkenau concentration camp. Höss had been ordered "to create a transition camp for ten thousand prisoners from the existing complex of well-preserved buildings," and he went to Auschwitz determined "to do things differently" and develop a more efficient camp than those at Dachau and Sachsenhausen, where he had previously served. Höss lived at Auschwitz in a villa with his wife and five children.

The earliest inmates at Auschwitz were Soviet prisoners-of-war and Polish prisoners, including peasants and intellectuals. Some 700 arrived in June 1940, and were told they would not survive more than three months. At its peak, Auschwitz comprised three separate facilities: Auschwitz I, Auschwitz II-Birkenau and Auschwitz III-Monowitz.  These included many satellite sub-camps, and the entire camp was built on about  that had been cleared of all inhabitants. Auschwitz I was the administrative centre for the complex; Auschwitz II Birkenau was the extermination camp where most of the murders were committed; and Auschwitz III Monowitz was the slave-labour camp for I.G. Farbenindustrie AG, and later other German industries. The main purpose of Monowitz was the production of buna, a form of synthetic rubber.

Most infamous at Auschwitz I, the original camp, was Block 11 and the courtyard between Blocks 10 and 11. High stone walls and a massive wooden gate shielded Nazi brutality from observers.  A condemned prisoner was led from Block 11, naked and bound, to the Death Wall at the back of the courtyard. A member of the Political Department then shot the prisoner in the back of the head with a small caliber pistol to minimize noise.  As punishment, Höss also employed standing cells in Block 11.  On multiple occasions, he condemned ten random prisoners to death by starvation in a Block 11 cell in retaliation for the escape of one inmate.

Mass murder

In June 1941, according to Höss's trial testimony, he was summoned to Berlin for a meeting with Himmler "to receive personal orders". Himmler told Höss that Hitler had given the order for the "Final solution". According to Höss, Himmler had selected Auschwitz for the extermination of Europe's Jews "on account of its easy access by rail and also because the extensive site offered space for measures ensuring isolation". Himmler described the project as a "secret Reich matter" and told Höss not to speak about it with SS-Gruppenführer Richard Glücks, head of the Nazi camp system run by the Death's Head Unit. Höss said that "no one was allowed to speak about these matters with any person and that everyone promised upon his life to keep the utmost secrecy". He told his wife about the camp's purpose only at the end of 1942, since she already knew about it from Fritz Bracht. Himmler told Höss that he would be receiving all operational orders from Adolf Eichmann, who arrived at the camp four weeks later.

Höss began testing and perfecting techniques of mass murder on 3 September 1941. His experiments led to Auschwitz becoming the most efficiently murderous instrument of the Final Solution and the Holocaust's most potent symbol. According to Höss, during standard camp operations, two or three trains carrying 2,000 prisoners each would arrive daily for four to six weeks. The prisoners were unloaded in the Birkenau camp and subjected to "selection", usually by a member of the SS medical staff."The unloading ramps and selections" Auschwitz.org  Men were separated from women.  Only those deemed suitable for Nazi slave labor would be allowed to live.  The elderly, infirm, children, and mothers with children were sent directly to the gas chambers.  Those found fit for labor were marched to barracks in either Birkenau or one of the Auschwitz camps, stripped naked, shorn of all hair, sprayed with disinfectant, and given a tattoo.  At first, small gassing bunkers were located deep in the woods to avoid detection. Later, four large gas chambers and crematoria were constructed in Birkenau to make the killing process more efficient, and to handle the sheer volume of victims.

Höss experimented with various gassing methods. According to Eichmann's trial testimony in 1961, Höss told him that he used cotton filters soaked in sulfuric acid for early killings. Höss later introduced hydrogen cyanide (prussic acid), produced from the pesticide Zyklon B, to the process of extermination, after his deputy Karl Fritzsch had tested it on a group of Russian prisoners in 1941. With Zyklon B, he said that it took 3–15 minutes for the victims to die and that "we knew when the people were dead because they stopped screaming."  In an interview at Nuremberg after the war, Höss commented that, after observing the prisoners die by Zyklon B, " ...this gassing set my mind at rest for the mass extermination of the Jews was to start soon."

In 1942, Höss had an affair with an Auschwitz inmate, a political prisoner named Eleonore Hodys (or Nora Mattaliano-Hodys). The woman became pregnant, and was imprisoned in a standing-only arrest cell. Released from the arrest, she had an abortion in a camp hospital in 1943 and, according to her later testimony, just barely evaded being selected to be killed. The affair may have led to Höss's recall from the Auschwitz command in 1943. SS judge Georg Konrad Morgen and his assistant Wiebeck investigated the case in 1944, interviewed Hodys and Höss and intended to proceed against Höss, but the case was dismissed. Morgen, Wiebeck and Hodys gave testimony after the war.

After being replaced as the Auschwitz commander by Arthur Liebehenschel, on 10 November 1943, Höss assumed Liebehenschel's former position as the head of Amt D I in Amtsgruppe D of the SS Main Economic and Administrative Office (WVHA); he also was appointed deputy of the inspector of the concentration camps under Richard Glücks.

 Operation Höss 
On 8 May 1944, Höss returned to Auschwitz to supervise Operation Höss, in which 430,000 Hungarian Jews were transported to the camp and killed in 56 days. Even Höss' expanded facility could not handle the huge number of victims' corpses, and the camp staff were obliged to dispose of thousands of bodies by burning them in open pits. In May and June alone, almost 10,000 Jews were being gassed per day.  Because the number of people exceeded the capacity of the gas chambers and crematoria, mass pit executions were established.  Jews were forced to undress then led to a hidden fire pit by Sonderkommando where they were shot by the SS, then thrown into the flames.

Ravensbrück
Höss's final posting was at Ravensbrück concentration camp. He moved there in November 1944 with his family who lived close by. After the completion of the gas chamber, Höss coordinated the operations of killing by gassing, with a death toll of more than 2,000 female prisoners.

Arrest, trial, and execution

In the last days of the war, Himmler advised Höss to disguise himself as a member of the Kriegsmarine. Adopting the pseudonym "Franz Lang" and working as a gardener, Höss lived in Gottrupel, Schleswig-Holstein with his family and evaded arrest for nearly a year. In 1946, Hanns Alexander, a German Jew who had fled to England in 1936 and became a Nazi hunter working for the British government's "No. 1 War Crimes Investigation Team", managed to discover Höss's location. Alexander, who was then a captain in the Royal Pioneer Corps, travelled to Höss's residence with a group of British soldiers, many of whom were also Jewish. Alexander's men unsuccessfully interrogated Höss's daughter Brigitte for information; according to Brigitte, the soldiers subsequently started to beat her brother Klaus, leading to Höss's wife to give up his location. According to Alexander, Höss attempted to bite into a cyanide pill once he was discovered by the soldiers. He initially denied his identity, "insisting he was a lowly gardener, but Alexander saw his wedding ring and ordered Höss to take it off, threatening to cut off his finger if he did not. Höss' name was inscribed inside. The soldiers accompanying Alexander began to beat Höss with axe handles. After a few moments and a minor internal debate, Alexander pulled them off."

Rudolf Höss testified at the International Military Tribunal at Nuremberg on 15 April 1946, where he gave a detailed accounting of his crimes. He was called as a defense witness by Ernst Kaltenbrunner's lawyer, Kurt Kauffman. The transcript of Höss' testimony was later entered as evidence during the 4th Nuremberg Military Tribunal known as the Pohl Trial, named for principal defendant Oswald Pohl. Affidavits that Rudolf Höss made while imprisoned in Nuremberg were also used at the Pohl and IG Farben trials.

In his affidavit made at Nuremberg on 5 April 1946, Höss stated:

When accused of murdering three and a half million people, Höss replied, "No. Only two and one half million—the rest died from disease and starvation."

On 25 May 1946, he was handed over to Polish authorities and the Supreme National Tribunal in Poland tried him for murder. In his essay on the Final Solution in Auschwitz, which he wrote in Kraków, he revised the previously given death toll:

In his memoir, he also revealed his mistreatment at the hands of his British captors:

His trial lasted from 11 to 29 March 1947. Höss was sentenced to death by hanging on 2 April 1947. The sentence was carried out on 16 April next to the crematorium of the former Auschwitz I concentration camp. He was hanged on a short-drop gallows constructed specifically for that purpose, at the location of the camp's Gestapo. The message on the board that marks the site reads:

Höss wrote his autobiography while awaiting execution; it was published first in Polish in 1951 and then in German in 1956, edited by Martin Broszat. Later it appeared in various English editions (see Bibliography). It consists of two parts, one about his own life and the second about other SS men with whom he had become acquainted, mainly Heinrich Himmler and Theodor Eicke, among several others. Höss blamed his subordinates and Kapos, prisoner functionaries, for the mistreatment of prisoners.  He claimed that, despite his best efforts, he was unable to stop the abuse.  He also stated that he was never cruel and never mistreated any inmate.  Höss blamed Hitler and Himmler for using their powers "wrongly and even criminally."  He saw himself as, " ...  a cog in the wheel of the great extermination machine created by the Third Reich."After discussions with Höss during the Nuremberg trials at which he testified, the American military psychologist Gustave Gilbert wrote the following:

Four days before he was executed, Höss acknowledged the enormity of his crimes in a message to the state prosecutor:

Shortly before his execution, Höss returned to the Catholic Church. On 10 April 1947, he received the sacrament of penance from Fr. , S.J., provincial of the Polish Province of the Society of Jesus. On the next day, the same priest administered to him Holy Communion as Viaticum.

Family
Rudolf Höss married Hedwig Hensel on 17 August 1929.
Issue:

 Klaus Höss: born 6 February 1930 and died in Australia
 Heidetraud Höss: born 9 April 1932.
 Inge-Brigitt Höss: born 18 August 1933.
 Hans-Jürgen Höss: born in May 1937
 Annegret Höss: born 7 November 1943.

In a farewell letter to his wife, Höss wrote on 11 April:

The same day in a farewell letter to his children, Höss told his eldest son:

Handwritten confession
The original affidavit, signed by Rudolf Höss, is in the possession of the United States Holocaust Memorial Museum in Washington, D.C. A scan of the document is exhibited on the third floor.

ReferencesNotesBibliography 
 
 
 
 
 
 
 
 
 
 
 
 Ravenswood, Linda, Frau Kommandant Hoess' Pink Cardigan, Rivets Literary Magazine, 2010.
 SS Personnel Service Record of Rudolf Höss, National Archives and Records Administration, College Park, Maryland, US.
 Further reading'''
 Fest, Joachim C. and Bullock, Michael (trans.) "Rudolf Höss – The Man from the Crowd" in The Face of the Third Reich New York: Penguin, 1979 (orig. published in German in 1963), pp. 415–432.  .
 Primomo, John W., (2020). Architect of Death at Auschwitz: A Biography of Rudolf Höss''. North Carolina: McFarland & Company. ISBN 978-1-4766-8146-7.

External links
 
 

1901 births
1947 deaths
20th-century Freikorps personnel
Auschwitz concentration camp personnel
Dachau concentration camp personnel
Executed Nazi concentration camp commandants
Executed mass murderers
Executed people from Baden-Württemberg
Executions by the Supreme National Tribunal
German Roman Catholics
German people convicted of crimes against humanity
Holocaust perpetrators in Poland
People convicted of murder by Germany
People from Baden-Baden
People from the Grand Duchy of Baden
Prussian Army personnel
Recipients of the Iron Cross (1914), 1st class
Romani genocide perpetrators
SS-Obersturmbannführer
Sachsenhausen concentration camp personnel
Waffen-SS personnel